National Highway 756, commonly referred to as NH 756 is a national highway in India. It is a secondary route of National Highway 56.  NH-756 runs in the state of Gujarat in India.

Route 
NH756 connects Bodeli, Jambugodha, Pavagarh and Halol in the state of Gujarat.

Junctions  
 
  Terminal near Bodeli.

See also 
 List of National Highways in India
 List of National Highways in India by state

References

External links 

 NH 756 on OpenStreetMap

National highways in India
National Highways in Gujarat